Aguilares may refer to:

 Aguilares, Argentina
 Aguilares, El Salvador
 Aguilares, Texas, United States